Anthony Durier (August 7, 1832 – February 28, 1904) was a French-born American prelate of the Catholic Church. He served as the third bishop of the Diocese of Natchitoches in Louisianan from 1885 until his death in 1904.

Biography

Early life
Durier was born on August 7, 1832 in Saint-Bonnet-des-Quarts, Loire in France to Jacques and Claudine (née Lucien) Durier. He made his preparatory studies for the priesthood at the minor seminary in Saint-Jodard, France, before entering the major seminary of Saint-Irénée at Lyon, France, in 1853.

While still a seminarian, he accepted an appeal from Archbishop Antoine Blanc for missionaries in the United States. He departed from Le Havre in October 1855 and arrived in New Orleans in December 1855. However, the diocesan seminary at Plattenville had burned to the ground earlier that year, and Durier was sent to Cincinnati to complete  his theological  studies at Mount St. Mary's Seminary of the West.

Priesthood
Durier was ordained a priest for the Archdiocese of New Orleans on October 28, 1856 by Archbishop John Purcell in Cincinnati. He remained in Ohio for a few months to better his knowledge of English, first serving as assistant pastor in Temperanceville and Chillicothe. Durier briefly served as pastor of St. Mary's Parish in Minerton, Ohio before returning to New Orleans in April 1857 to serve as assistant pastor at St. Louis Cathedral.

In 1859, Durier was appointed pastor of the Church of the Annunciation Parish in New Orleans, where he remained for 25 years.  He guided the parish through the American Civil War, a yellow fever epidemic in 1878, and many floods. Durier established a number of Catholic schools, including the first school for African-American children in the area. From November to December 1884, he attended the third Plenary Council of Baltimore as a theological consultant to Archbishop Francis Xavier Leray.

Bishop of Natchitoches
On December 19, 1884, Durier was appointed bishop of the Diocese of Natchitoches by Pope Leo XIII. He received his episcopal consecration on March 19, 1885, from Archbishop Leray, with Bishops John Neraz and Nicolaus Gallagher serving as co-consecrators, at St. Louis Cathedral in New Orleans.

Durier's most notable contribution as bishop was the advancement of Catholic education. In 1886, he ordered that every parish in the diocese should establish a parochial school, and in 1889 he organized the first Catholic school board. He invited several religious orders to the diocese, such as the Sisters of Divine Providence, Carmelites, and Jesuits, who established schools in Alexandria, Mansfield, and Shreveport, all in Louisiana. He opened six schools for African-American children, with a total enrollment of more than 300 pupils in 1894. Durier also established seven new parishes and finished construction on the Cathedral of the Immaculate Conception in Natchitoches, which he consecrated in September 1892.

Durier died in Natchitoches on February 28, 1904, at age 71. He is buried in the cemetery of the Daughters of the Cross in Shreveport.

Notes

Episcopal succession

1833 births
1904 deaths
French Roman Catholic bishops in North America
Roman Catholic bishops of Alexandria
19th-century Roman Catholic bishops in the United States